Batak is an Austronesian language spoken by the Batak people on Palawan Island in the Philippines. It is sometimes disambiguated from the Batak languages as Palawan Batak.

Batak is spoken in the communities of Babuyan, Maoyon, Tanabag, Langogan, Tagnipa, Caramay, and Buayan. Surrounding languages include Southern Tagbanwa, Central Tagbanwa, Kuyonon, and Agutaynen.

Phonology

Pronouns

References

Aeta languages
Endangered Austronesian languages
Palawanic languages
Languages of Palawan